The Mier Wolf House was a historic building located in Mason City, Iowa, United States.  Wolf was a prominent member of the local business community, operating a furniture store.  Completed in 1909, this house is an early example of Prairie School architecture in Mason City.  While its architect is unknown, it exhibits similarities to Frank Lloyd Wright's Mayan Period.  The house features geometric wall decorations, truncated, stylized piers, and paired sculpted shapes on the heavy fascia of the broad overhanging hip roof.  It was listed on the National Register of Historic Places in 1980.

References

Houses completed in 1909
Prairie School architecture in Iowa
Houses in Mason City, Iowa
National Register of Historic Places in Mason City, Iowa
Houses on the National Register of Historic Places in Iowa